Idioblasta is a genus of moths of the family Crambidae.

Species
Idioblasta acleropa (Meyrick, 1935)
Idioblasta isoterma (Meyrick, 1935)
Idioblasta lacteata Warren, 1891
Idioblasta procellaris (Meyrick, 1935)

References

Crambinae
Crambidae genera
Taxa named by William Warren (entomologist)